Weir Lake may refer to:

Lake Weir, in Florida, United States
Weir Lake (Manitoba), in Manitoba, Canada